Douglas Cedeño (born 11 February 1960) is a Venezuelan footballer. He played in seven matches for the Venezuela national football team in 1985. He was also part of Venezuela's squad for the 1983 Copa América tournament.

References

External links
 

1960 births
Living people
Venezuelan footballers
Venezuela international footballers
Place of birth missing (living people)
Association football midfielders
A.C.C.D. Mineros de Guayana players